Belgaum Fort is in the city of Belgaum, in the Belgaum district, in Karnataka state, India. It was begun by Jaya Raya, also called Bichi Raja, an ally of the Ratta Dynasty, in the year 1204 AD. It has undergone several renovations over the centuries under dynastic rulers of the region.

The fort, built with fine ramparts and a large moat, has a rich history with historical and religious monuments dated to the Adil Shahi dynasty.

The fort has been captured in battles many times, as the possession of local rulers, until the region was stabilized by the British Raj. It is notable in modern history because Mahatma Gandhi was imprisoned by the British in this fort during India's freedom struggle.

Geography
The Markandeya River flows nearby.

There is a Lake in front of the Fort known as Killa Lake.

History
The fort's history is traced to the Ratta Dynasty with lineage to the Rashtrakuta Dynasty (earlier chieftains of Saundatti, who later shifted their capital to Belgaum), Vijayanagara rulers, Bijapur Sultans or Bahmanis, Marathas (Shivaji Maharaj)and finally by the British in that order. Before Rattas, Shatavahanas, Chalukyas and Kadambas from Goa have ruled over the region.

The Belgaum fort belonged to the Ratta dynasty from the time it was built in 1204 AD by a Ratta officer named Bichiraja. Belgaum, the city around the fort, served as the capital of that dynasty between 1210 AD and 1250 AD. Rattas were defeated by the Yadava Dynasty of Devagiri, and they briefly controlled the fort. At the turn of the 14th century, the Khaljis of Delhi invaded and succeeded in ruining the indigenous powers of the region – the Yadava and the Hoysalas —without providing a viable administration. This lacuna was made good by the Vijayanagara Empire, which had become the established power of the area by 1336 AD.

In 1474 AD, the Bahmani Sultanate, then ruling from Bidar, captured the fort of Belgaum under the leadership of Mahamood Gawan. In 1518 AD, the Bahamani Sultanate split up into five small states, and Belgaum became part of the Adilshahi sultanate of Bijapur. The Ismail Adil Shah of Adilshahi dynasty reinforced the fort with the help of Asad Khan Lari (a Persian from the province of Lar) and much of the existing structures dates from 1519 AD.

In Belgaum, the rule of Adilshahs began in the times of Ismail Adil Shah. Asad Khan Lari assisted Ismail in the battle for the fort and conferred with Belgaum as his jagir in 1511 AD (in 1519 AD, Asad Khan completed the Masjid Safa in the Belgaum fort).

In 1686, the Mughal emperor Aurangzeb defeated the Bijapur sultanate, and Belgaum came under his control. This was a short-lived control because, after the death of Aurangzeb in 1707, the Mughal empire's control declined. With this changed situation, the Maratha confederacy was taken over by the Peshwas. In 1776, Hyder Ali of Mysore won over this region, but only for a short period. The Peshwas, with British assistance, defeated Hyder Ali and regained control of Belgaum.
With changed circumstances over the years, the same British attacked the Belgaum fort, which was under Peshwas control. They held it under siege from 21 March to 12 April 1818 and took control of the fort and deposed the Peshwas. Shivalinga Raju, the Kittur Desai, helped the British in this attack on the fort. As a reward, the British allowed Desai to rule over Belgaum town and the fort.

The fort is currently used as the regional headquarters of the Indian Army.

Fort structure
Belgaum Fort is one of the oldest in the state of Karnataka. It had fortifications designed to repel attacks of invading armies. It was originally built by Bichiraja (Ratta Dynasty) in 1204.

Built in an undulating plain, the fort has an oval shape and is surrounded by a deep and wide moat excavated in soft red stone.

Two massive bastions flanked by a large gate, which was originally an entry gate through a bridge, has since been blocked. The gate now in use (said to have been designed by a Brahmin) is considered a fine specimen of Indian architecture. It has a guard chamber, a "groined roof once ornamented with pendants". The exterior of the gate is decorated with large motifs of animals and birds. The gateway is covered by massive doors made of iron designed for defense. An inscription on the top of the arch of the gate in Persian ascribes its building to Jakub Ali Khan. The inscription reads:

"Jakub Ali Khan, who is a joy to the heart, by whose benevolence the world is prosperous, built the wall of the fort from its base as strong as the barrier of Sicardis."

In 1631 AD the main gate of the fort was built.

There is a western gate with an archway, which is guarded only by a chain stretched across two old cannons. This provides access from a sloping road crossed by a causeway over the moat.

The fort has Hindu, Jain and Muslim architectural influence with temples and mosques within its limits, indicating cultural syncretism. The architectural styles seen in the mosques are of the Indo-Saracenic and Deccan type. The fort has been built with stones and mud. A wide moat runs round the fort.

Temples

Jain temples

Of the two Jain temples inside the fort, the 'Kamal Basadi', a basadi with the Neminatha idol in black stone (found in a forest nearby) deified on a stone-carved pedestal, is more famous. It was built in 1204 AD. The other temple, called the 'Chikki Basadi', is in ruins (see picture). Both temples were built inside the fort in the Chalukyan architecture style.

The Mukhamantapa (Mukha main hall) of the Kamal Basadi is very impressive, with a neatly depicted lotus carving projecting from the ceiling. It is accessed through steps partly enclosed by a balustrade with a large dome of great beauty. The lotus pendant is covered by a large pyramidal roof.

The pillars that support the roof with the lotus pendant are founded on plinths. Some pillars made of black basaltic stones (said to have magnetic characteristics) are highly polished. It is named the Kamal Basadi since the tower of the temple depicts kamal (lotus) with 72 petals, which presently displays images of the past 24 tirthankaras but can depict the present and future thirthankars. The pillars are well carved with decorations and neatly polished.

Other idols seen in the temple are of Bhagwan Sumatinath in the kayotsarga posture, Bhagwan Parshvanath under the shade of seven-hooded serpent (Nagaraj), Bhagwan Adinath in the padmasana posture and the Navagraha. The Archeology Department renovated this temple in 1996.

The second Jain temple, Chikki Basadi, in ruins now, was once considered as a "remarkable piece of Jain architecture". It has a frontage that displays festooned rows of dancing figurines, musicians, and trimmed flowers.

Hindu temples
There are two Hindu shrines at the fort entrance: one devoted to Ganesha and another to goddess Durga. The Durga temple is dedicated to multi-armed goddess Durga, as considered the goddess of forts and warfare. It is in a corner of the fort. The outer facade of the temple exhibits painted images of mythological figures.

Mosques
The fort has two mosques or masjids: Safa Masjid and Jamia Masjid. The former mosque is the most frequented by the Muslim population of Belgaum. Safa Masjid was completed in 1519 by Asad Khan Lari (testified by the Persian inscription). The mosque's pillars have exquisite inscriptions in a fusion of Nagari and Persian styles. It is said that two of the pillars are from Hindu temples and have Kannada inscriptions in Nāgarī scripts. One pillar dated to 1199 AD is credited to Ratta King Kartaveerya IV and the other pillar dated to 1261 AD is credited to Sevuna (Yadava) Krishna. The Jamia Masjid, dated 1585–86, was built by Sher Khan.

Access
The fort is in the precincts of Belgaum city (which is in the northwestern parts of Karnataka) and lies at the border of two states: Maharashtra and Goa. It is well connected by road, rail and air services to all parts of the country.

Belgaum is connected by road via the National Highway 4 (connecting Maharashtra (now part of the Golden Quadrilateral), Karnataka, Andhra Pradesh and Tamil Nadu) and NH 4A (connecting Karnataka and Goa). It is midway between Bangalore and Mumbai.

The distances to the nearest cities in the border states of Maharashtra and Goa are Hubbali - , Dharwad - , Mangalore - , Goa-, Kolhapur -  and Pune - . It is close to the bus station.

The airport serving the city is Belgaum Airport at Sambra which is the oldest airport in North Karnataka.

Belgaum is well connected by rail to major destinations such as Bangalore, Mumbai (via Miraj) and Goa.

References

Buildings and structures completed in 1204
Forts in Belagavi district
Belgaum
13th-century Jain temples